Leptostomias is a genus of barbeled dragonfishes.

Species
There are currently 12 recognized species in this genus:
 Leptostomias analis Regan & Trewavas, 1930
 Leptostomias bermudensis Beebe, 1932
 Leptostomias bilobatus (Koefoed, 1956)
 Leptostomias gladiator (Zugmayer, 1911)
 Leptostomias gracilis Regan & Trewavas, 1930
 Leptostomias haplocaulus Regan & Trewavas, 1930
 Leptostomias leptobolus Regan & Trewavas, 1930
 Leptostomias longibarba Regan & Trewavas, 1930
 Leptostomias macronema C. H. Gilbert, 1905 (Long-threaded dragonfish)
 Leptostomias macropogon Norman, 1930
 Leptostomias multifilis S. Imai, 1941
 Leptostomias robustus S. Imai, 1941

References

Stomiidae
Marine fish genera
Ray-finned fish genera
Taxa named by Charles Henry Gilbert